Cuddy is an Irish surname. Notable people with the surname include:

Amy Cuddy (born 1972), American social psychologist
Alison Cuddy, American radio host
David Cuddy (born 1952), American businessman and Republican Party politician
Devin Cuddy (born 1987), Canadian singer-songwriter
Jim Cuddy (born 1955), Canadian singer-songwriter
Lola Cuddy (born 1939), Canadian music psychologist
P.J. Cuddy, hurling player with Laois and Camross
Paul Cuddy (born 1959), English footballer
Susan Ahn Cuddy (born 1915), the first female gunnery officer in the United States Navy
Thomas J. Cuddy, former chief of police in Los Angeles, California

Fictional characters include
Lisa Cuddy, in the television series House

See also

Caddy (name)

English-language surnames